The WWF International Tag Team Championship was a tag team championship in the World Wide Wrestling Federation from 1969 to 1972 and in the renamed World Wrestling Federation and New Japan Pro-Wrestling for a short time in 1985.

Reigns

Names

Reigns

Combined reigns

By team

By wrestler

See also
 List of former championships in WWE
 Tag team championships in WWE

Footnotes

References

External links
WWWF/WWF International Tag Team Title History

New Japan Pro-Wrestling championships
International professional wrestling championships
WWE tag team championships
International